Aruwa Ameh (10 December 1990 – 28 November 2011) was a Nigerian professional footballer. He last played for Bayelsa United in the Nigeria National League. In 2007 while playing with Kaduna United he was the top scorer in the Nigeria Premier League. Ameh died of paralysis almost a week after being hospitalized for arm pain in 2011 at Kaduna.

References 

1991 births
2011 deaths
Nigerian footballers
Kaduna United F.C. players
Bayelsa United F.C. players
Sportspeople from Kaduna
Nigeria Professional Football League players
Association football forwards
People with paraplegia
Neurological disease deaths in Nigeria